A marten is a mammal in the family Mustelidae. Marten, Mårten, or Martén may also refer to:

Animals
Types of marten:
Beech marten
American marten
Japanese marten
European pine marten
Yellow-throated marten
Nilgiri marten
Sable

Places
Marten, Bulgaria
Marten, Wiltshire, England
Marten, district of Dortmund, Germany 
Marten River, Alberta, Canada
Marten River, Ontario, Canada
Mårten Trotzigs Gränd, alley in Stockholm, Sweden

Other uses
Marten (name), people and characters with the given name or surname
Croatian kuna, literally "marten", from the use of marten pelts as currency
Marten Falls First Nation, Anishinaabe First Nation reserve, Ontario, Canada
 Marten (HBC vessel), operated by the HBC from 1845-1850, see Hudson's Bay Company vessels
 Marten (HBC vessel), operated by the HBC from 1852-1878, see Hudson's Bay Company vessels

See also
Maarten (given name)
Martens (disambiguation)
Martin (disambiguation)
Marton (disambiguation)
Martyn (disambiguation)

Animal common name disambiguation pages